Royz is a Japanese visual kei rock band formed in 2009 in Osaka. Currently, Subaru is on vocals, Kuina is on guitar, Koudai is on bass and Tomoya is on drums and they are on the label B.P Records.

Members 
 Subaru (昴) – Vocal
 Kuina (杙凪) – Guitar
 Koudai (公大) – Bass guitar
 Tomoya (智也) – Drums

Past members 
 Kazuki – Guitar

Biography 
Royz started their activities in Osaka, on September 28, 2009. Before with four members, guitarist Kuina joined in 2010 and the band moved to Tokyo and joined BP Records.

Kazuki left the band in 2014 after a performance at Akasaka Blitz, due to family problems.

With the bands Kiryu and Codomo Dragon, Royz released the single "FAMILY PARTY" and the video for Ryouran Resonance (繚乱レゾナンス).

In November 2016, Koudai announced that he would pause activities in the band to treat his spondylosis. He returned in December of the same year.

Royz released the single "Ignite" on May 20, 2019, in four different versions. On March 18, 2020, the band released the 19th single, DAYDREAM.

Discography

Albums

References 

Visual kei musical groups
Japanese rock music groups
Musical groups established in 2009